Huck Finn's Playland is an amusement park located in Albany, New York. It opened in 2015 and features the rides of the former Hoffman's Playland.

History 
In 2014, David and Ruth Hoffman, owners of Hoffman's Playland in Latham, NY, announced that the park would close in September. The Hoffmans had searched for a new owner for the amusement rides to no avail, and the rides were scheduled to go to auction. Shortly after the park closed, the owners of Huck Finn's Playland announced their intent to purchase the rides and build a new park next to their furniture store in Albany.

The park was constructed on a vacant 3 acre lot, and opened in June 2015. The new park features the Hoffman's Playland rides, a new concession building, and an arcade relocated inside the warehouse. The Lusse Auto Skooter bumper cars were purchased but were not rebuilt at the new park. They were sold to Knoebels Amusement Resort in 2017, where they now operate.

The 2020 season of Huck Finn's playland was canceled due to the COVID-19 pandemic. It marked the first time in the park's history without an operating season. It reopened on May 8, 2021, while maintaining social distancing and masks guidelines.

Rides

Retired Rides

See also
Hoffman's Playland
List of amusement parks in the Americas

References

External links

Amusement parks in New York (state)
2015 establishments
Tourist attractions in Albany, New York
Tourist attractions in Albany County, New York